Nimera is a village in Sikar district of Rajasthan, India. According to the 2011 census it has a population of 203 living in 392 households.

References

Villages in Sikar district